Christian Rauchbauer (born 6 September 1984) is an Austrian former competitive figure skater. He is the 2007 NRW Trophy bronze medalist, the 2005 Copenhagen Trophy champion, and a seven-time national medalist (four silver, three bronze). At the 2007 World Championships in Tokyo, where he placed 29th, he became the first Austrian skater to perform a quad toe loop jump in competition.

Programs

Competitive highlights
JGP: Junior Grand Prix

References

External links
 

Austrian male single skaters
Figure skaters at the 2007 Winter Universiade
1984 births
People from Eisenstadt
Living people
Sportspeople from Burgenland
Competitors at the 2005 Winter Universiade
21st-century Austrian people